Cytharomorula dollfusi is a species of sea snail, a marine gastropod mollusk, in the family Muricidae, the murex snails or rock snails.

Distribution
This marine species occurs off Egypt.

References

 Lamy, Ed., 1938 Mission Robert PH. Dollfus en Egypte, 7, Mollusca Testacea. Mémoires de l'Institut d'Egypte, vol. 37, p. 89 p, 1pl
 Houart R. (2013) Revised classification of a group of small species of Cytharomorula Kuroda, 1953 (Muricidae: Ergalataxinae) from the Indo-West Pacific. Novapex 14(2): 25-34.

dollfusi
Gastropods described in 1938